The New York Shipbuilding Corporation (or New York Ship for short) was an American shipbuilding company that operated from 1899 to 1968, ultimately completing more than 500 vessels for the U.S. Navy, the United States Merchant Marine, the United States Coast Guard, and other maritime concerns. At its peak during World War II, NYSB was the largest and most productive shipyard in the world. Its best-known vessels include the destroyer , the cruiser , the aircraft carrier , the nuclear-powered cargo ship , and a quartet of cargo-passenger liners nicknamed the 4 Aces.

History
It was founded in 1899 by Henry G. Morse (1850–2 June 1903), an engineer noted in connection with bridge design and construction and senior partner of Morse Bridge Company. The original plan was to build a shipyard on Staten Island, thus the name of the company. Plans to acquire a site failed and, after exploration as far south as Virginia with special attention being paid to the Delaware River area, a location in the southern part of Camden, New Jersey, was chosen instead. Site selection specifically considered the needs of the planned application of bridge building practices of prefabrication and assembly line production of ships in covered ways. Construction of the plant began in July 1899 and was so rapid that the keel of the first ship was laid November 1900. That ship, contract number 1, was M. S. Dollar, later to be modified as an oil tanker and renamed J. M. Guffey. Morse died after securing contracts for 20 ships. He was followed as president by De Coursey May.

On November 27, 1916, a special meeting of the company's stockholders ratified sale of the "fifteen million dollar plant" to a group of companies composed of American International Corporation, International Mercantile Marine Co., W. R. Grace and Company and the Pacific Mail Steamship Company.

New York Ship's unusual covered ways produced everything from aircraft carriers, battleships, and luxury liners to barges and car floats.

 

During World War I, New York Ship expanded rapidly to fill orders from the U.S. Navy and the Emergency Fleet Corporation. A critical shortage of worker housing led to the construction of Yorkship Village, a planned community of 1,000 brick homes designed by Electus Darwin Litchfield and financed by the War Department. Yorkship Village is now the Fairview section of the City of Camden.

New York Ship's World War II production included all nine  light carriers (CVL), built on  light cruiser hulls; the 40,000-ton battleship ; all three of the six 30,000 ton Alaska-class cruisers that were built (and ), four 15,000 ton Baltimore-class heavy cruisers, and 98 LCTs (Landing Craft, Tank), many of which took part in the D-Day landings at Normandy.

After World War II, a much-diminished New York Ship subsisted on a trickle of contracts from the United States Maritime Administration and the U.S. Navy. In 1959 the yard launched the NS Savannah, the world's first nuclear powered merchant ship. The yard launched its last civilian vessel in 1960, and its last naval vessel, was ordered in 1967. Guardfish was commissioned in December 1967.

In 1968, lacking new naval orders, NYS ceased operations. , then under construction, was towed to Ingalls Shipbuilding in Pascagoula, Mississippi, for completion.

The yard's site is now part of the Port of Camden.

World War II Slipways

Ships built 

Ships built by New York Ship include:
 Aircraft carriers
 1 of 2 
 , launched 7 April 1925
 9 of 9  light carriers
 
 
 2 of 2  light carriers
 , 
 1 of 4 
 , launched 21 May 1960
 Battleships
 1 of 3  
 
 1 of 3 
 1 of 4 
  
 Colliers 
 SS Plymouth served as USS Plymouth from 1918 to 1919, as an auxiliary cargo ship, then returned to civilian service as SS Plymouth
 SS Fairmont served as USS Fairmont from 1918 to 1919, as an auxiliary cargo ship, then returned to civilian service again as the SS Fairmont. In 1922 she was renamed Nebraskan. For World War II she was renamed SS Black Point and was the last ship sunk by a U-boat on May 5, 1945.
 SS Winding Gulf
 SS Tidewater did not serve in the US Navy. Renamed SS Isaac T. Mann in 1923 and was scrapped at Baltimore in 1954.
 SS Glen White served as USS Glen White from 1918 to 1919 then returned to civilian service as SS Glen White.
 SS Sewalls Point did not serve in the US Navy.<ref>Google books: The Rudder; SS Sewalls Point](Thomas Fleming Day, Fawcett Publications, 1919, pp. 233)</ref>
 SS Franklin did not serve in the US Navy, became SS Nevadan in 1921, then SS Oakey L. Alexander in 1926. Was wrecked on the Maine coast on 3 March 1947.
 SS William N. Page 
 Cruisers
 1 of 2  heavy cruisers
  launched 7 November 1931
 3 of 9  light cruisers
  launched 8 May 1937
  2 October 1937
  19 March 1938
 4 of 14  heavy cruisers
 launched 2 July 1944
 13 August 1944
 15 October 1944
 6 May 1945
 3 of 3  large cruiser
 8 of 27  light cruisers
 4 of 8 s
 Fast combat support ship
 

 Oil tankers
 SS Gulfoil Gulflight launched 1914. Center of a diplomatic incident when torpedoed in World War I.
 SS Sylvan Arrow, launched 1918
 (1921) sunk by Japanese submarine I-25 in 1942
 SS Dixie Arrow  launched 1922
 
 Submarine
 Thresher/Permit-class fast attack submarine (nuclear)
 
 
 
  fast attack submarine (nuclear) 
  (completed at Ingalls Shipbuilding)
 Barbel-class fast attack submarine (diesel):
 
 Nuclear-powered merchant ship
 
 Passenger/cargo ship
 SS Panhandle State: Also named: President Monroe, President Buchanan, (Iris), and Emily H. M. Weder.
 SS Munargo: Also named Arthur Murray (Army but never used), USS Munargo (Navy), USAT Thistle'', USAHS Thistle (Army hospital). [https://history.army.mil/documents/WWII/wwii_Troopships.pdf 
 Other ships and boats
 —the biggest passenger-carrying riverboat (paddle steamer) ever built.

See also
New York Shipbuilding strike

Footnotes

References

 CV / CVL Class Carriers: Book; USS INDEPENDENCE CVL-22, A War Diary of the Nation's First Dedicated Night Carrier by: John G. Lambert

Bibliography

External links 

New York Shipbuilding Company Historical Sites
A Tribute to a Place Called Yorkship
New York Shipbuilding, Camden NJ 
A web exhibit of ship christening photos that includes twenty images of launching ceremonies at New York Shipbuilding

Shipyards of the United States
Defunct shipbuilding companies of the United States
Companies based in Camden, New Jersey
History of Camden, New Jersey
Industrial buildings and structures in New Jersey
Defunct manufacturing companies based in New Jersey
Shipyards building World War II warships